Derrick Jabar Gaffney (born December 1, 1980) is an American former football wide receiver. He played college football for the University of Florida, and was recognized as a consensus All-American. He was drafted by the Houston Texans in the second round of the 2002 NFL draft, and also played for the New England Patriots, Denver Broncos, Washington Redskins and Miami Dolphins.

Early years
Gaffney was born in San Antonio, Texas.  He attended William M. Raines High School in Jacksonville, Florida, and was a letterman for the Raines Vikings high school football team.  In football, he was a two-year starter as a wide receiver, and as a junior in 1997, he caught the game-winning, fourth-quarter touchdown pass in the state championship game.

College career 

Gaffney accepted an athletic scholarship to attend the University of Florida in Gainesville, Florida, where he played for coach Steve Spurrier's Florida Gators football team in 2000 and 2001.  The Gators coaching staff decided to redshirt him as a true freshman in 1999.  Gaffney became a prolific pass-catcher as a first-year starter for the Gators in 2000, and made the game-winning touchdown “catch” with fourteen seconds remaining to defeat the Tennessee Volunteers 27–23—a game that ultimately decided the 2000 winner of the Eastern Division of the Southeastern Conference (SEC).  Gaffney amassed 1,184 receiving yards and fourteen touchdown receptions in 2000, and another 1,191 and thirteen touchdowns in 2001.

He was a first-team All-SEC selection in 2000 and 2001; he was  a College Football News first-team All-American after his redshirt freshman season in 2000, and was recognized as a unanimous first-team All-American by the Associated Press, American Football Coaches Association, Football Writers Association of America, Sporting News, and Walter Camp Foundation following his 2001 sophomore season.  In 2001, he was one of the three finalists for the Biletnikoff Award, recognizing the best receiver in college football.  He finished his two-season college career with 138 receptions for 2,375 yards and twenty-seven touchdowns, and was chosen by his teammates as the Gators' most valuable player.  He remains the only receiver in Gators history with two seasons of 1,000 yards or more.

Professional career

Houston Texans 

Gaffney was selected with the 1st pick in the 2nd round of the 2002 NFL draft by the Houston Texans. His tenure with the team was marred by his often inconsistent play which led to his benching in favor of veteran receivers, in particular Corey Bradford. After his rookie contract was up, the Texans chose not to re-sign him.

Philadelphia Eagles 

On March 16, 2006, the Eagles signed Gaffney to a one-year contract. He was released before the start of the season.

New England Patriots 

Gaffney signed a two-year deal with the New England Patriots on October 9, 2006. On March 5, 2008, Gaffney re-signed with the Patriots for one year worth $2 million.

In his first-ever playoff game, on January 7, 2007 against the New York Jets, Gaffney had a caught eight passes for 104 yards, his second 100-yard performance as a receiver (in ten regular season games, Gaffney caught 11 passes for 142 yards and one touchdown.) Gaffney followed that performance a week later against San Diego with another 100-yard game, in which he caught ten passes and scored a touchdown.

Gaffney finished the 2008 season with 44 receptions for 468 yards and two touchdowns.

Denver Broncos 

On February 27, 2009, Gaffney signed a four-year, $10 million contract with the Denver Broncos. In the Broncos' week 17 loss to the Kansas City Chiefs, Gaffney caught 14 passes for 213 yards as the Broncos played without Brandon Marshall, who was benched for disciplinary reasons by head coach Josh McDaniels.  He finished the 2009 season with 54 receptions for 732 yards and two touchdowns, ranking second on the team in receptions and receiving yards. Gaffney put up 875 yards in 2010.

Washington Redskins 

Gaffney was traded to the Washington Redskins for defensive end Jeremy Jarmon on July 27, 2011.  In , he led the team with 68 receptions, 947 yards and 5 touchdowns, all career bests.

On April 18, 2012, Gaffney announced that he was told not to attend the team's offseason conditioning program and that the Redskins were attempting to trade him.  Head coach Mike Shanahan later stated that Gaffney could still remain on the Redskins, but felt obligated to let him explore other options throughout the league.

Gaffney was released by the Redskins on May 1, 2012.

Return to New England Patriots 

Gaffney signed a two-year contract to return to the Patriots on May 2, 2012.  He was released by the team on August 27.

Miami Dolphins 
On October 2, 2012, Gaffney was signed by the Miami Dolphins. On November 20, 2012, Gaffney was waived. Days after his release, the NFL announced that Gaffney would be suspended for two games for failing to report an arrest to the league that occurred in Miami in 2010.

NFL career statistics 

Receiving Stats

Legal Issues

In February 2000, Gaffney was charged with allegedly stealing $245 and a watch from the Florida Field locker room during the high school state championships, but the prosecutor placed him in a pretrial diversion program.  After Steve Spurrier kicked him off the team in December 1999, he was eventually allowed to earn his way back onto the squad but forfeited his scholarship for a year.

During the 2001 season, Gaffney and another athlete forcefully detained a 15-year-old boy who was stealing motor scooters from their apartment, and held him until police arrived.  The boy's mother later alleged that Gaffney beat, kicked, choked and attempted to drown her son.  The police declined to file charges and the state attorney agreed, stating the mother's allegations were inconsistent with the evidence and no jury would convict given the circumstances.

In 2006, Gaffney was arrested and charged with unlawful possession of a handgun in New Jersey.

In 2010, Gaffney was charged with non-violent resisting arrest.

In January 2016, he was arrested for marijuana and drug possession.

In October 2017, Gaffney was arrested for domestic battery.

Family 
Gaffney and ex-wife Terin have a son, Jackson Tyrel Gaffney, and a daughter, Teagan Danae Gaffney.  He is the son of former New York Jets wide receiver Derrick Gaffney, and the first cousin of NFL cornerback Lito Sheppard.

See also 

 List of Florida Gators football All-Americans
 List of Florida Gators in the NFL Draft
 List of Houston Texans players
 List of New England Patriots players
 List of Washington Redskins players

References

Bibliography 

 Carlson, Norm, University of Florida Football Vault: The History of the Florida Gators, Whitman Publishing, LLC, Atlanta, Georgia (2007).  .
 Golenbock, Peter, Go Gators!  An Oral History of Florida's Pursuit of Gridiron Glory, Legends Publishing, LLC, St. Petersburg, Florida (2002).  .
 Hairston, Jack, Tales from the Gator Swamp: A Collection of the Greatest Gator Stories Ever Told, Sports Publishing, LLC, Champaign, Illinois (2002).  .

External links 
  Jabar Gaffney – Florida Gators bio

1980 births
Living people
All-American college football players
American football wide receivers
Denver Broncos players
Florida Gators football players
Houston Texans players
Miami Dolphins players
New England Patriots players
Players of American football from Jacksonville, Florida
Players of American football from San Antonio
William M. Raines High School alumni
Washington Redskins players
Ed Block Courage Award recipients